The long-term heavy consumption of alcohol (alcohol use disorder) can cause severe detrimental effects. Health effects associated with alcohol intake in large amounts include an increased risk of developing an alcohol use disorder, malnutrition, chronic pancreatitis, erectile dysfunction, heart failure, atrial fibrillation,  gastritis, stomach ulcers, alcoholic liver disease, certain types of dementia, and several types of cancer. In addition, damage to the central nervous system and peripheral nervous system (e.g., painful peripheral neuropathy) can occur from chronic heavy alcohol consumption. There is also an increased risk for accidental injuries, for example, those sustained in traffic accidents and falls. Studies show that individuals with heavy substance use have a much higher risk of having other disorders. A cross-sectional observational study found evidence that people who used substances had the highest risk for five of the disorders studied. However, even light and moderate alcohol consumption increase the risk for developing certain types of cancer. Among women, light drinkers have a four percent increase risk of breast cancer, while moderate drinkers have a 23 percent increase in risk of the disease. 

The long-term use of alcohol is capable of damaging nearly every organ and system in the body. The developing adolescent brain is particularly vulnerable to the toxic effects of alcohol. In addition, the developing fetal brain is also vulnerable, and fetal alcohol spectrum disorders (FASDs) may result if pregnant mothers consume alcohol.

While alcohol consumption does not improve overall health, the inverse relation in Western cultures between alcohol consumption and cardiovascular disease has been known for over 100 years. Many physicians do not promote alcohol consumption; however, given the many health concerns associated with it, some suggest that alcohol should be regarded as a recreational drug, and promote exercise and good nutrition to combat cardiovascular disease.

Negative effects include increased risk of liver diseases, oropharyngeal cancer, esophageal cancer and pancreatitis. Conversely, moderate intake of alcohol may have some beneficial effects on gastritis and cholelithiasis. Chronic alcohol misuse has serious effects on physical and mental health. Chronic excess alcohol intake, or alcohol dependence, can lead to a wide range of neuropsychiatric or neurological impairment, cardiovascular disease, liver disease, and malignant neoplasms. The psychiatric disorders associated with alcoholism include major depression, dysthymia, depersonalization, mania, hypomania, panic disorder, phobias, generalized anxiety disorder, personality disorders, schizophrenia, suicide, neurologic deficits (e.g. impairments of working memory, emotions, executive functions, visuospatial abilities and gait and balance) and brain damage. There is no evidence that alcohol consumption causes these disorders, but people with these conditions may turn to alcohol as a coping mechanism at a greater rate or frequency than the general population. Alcohol dependence is associated with hypertension, coronary heart disease, and ischemic stroke, cancer of the respiratory system, and also cancers of the digestive system, liver, breast and ovaries. Heavy drinking is associated with liver disease, such as cirrhosis. Excessive alcohol consumption can have a negative impact on aging.

Some nations have introduced alcohol packaging warning messages that inform consumers about alcohol and cancer, and about risk of fetal alcohol syndrome for women who drink while pregnant.

Mortality effects
A 2016 systematic review and meta-analysis found that moderate ethanol consumption does not prolong life compared with lifetime abstention from ethanol consumption. A systematic analysis of data from the Global Burden of Disease study found that consumption of ethanol increases the risk of cancer and increases the risk of all-cause mortality, and that the level of ethanol consumption that minimizes disease is zero consumption. Some studies have concluded that drinking small quantities of alcohol (less than one drink per day in women and two in men) is associated with a decreased risk of heart disease, stroke, diabetes mellitus, and early death. These studies, however, have been replaced by newer studies indicating that even light consumption of alcohol does not improve overall health. Some of these studies lumped former ethanol drinkers and life-long abstainers into a single group of nondrinkers, hiding the health benefits of life-long abstention from ethanol.  Drinking more than this amount actually increases the risk of heart disease, high blood pressure, atrial fibrillation, and stroke. Risk is greater in younger people due to binge drinking which may result in violence or accidents. About 3.3 million deaths (5.9% of all deaths) are believed to be due to alcohol each year.

Maximum quantity recommended

Different countries recommend different maximum quantities. In the UK, the Chief Medical Officers' recommends men and women drink no more than 14 units per week. A single unit corresponds to 8 g of ethanol. For most countries, the maximum quantity for men is 140 g–210 g per week. For women, the range is 84 g–140 g per week. Most countries recommend total abstinence during pregnancy and lactation.

Contradictory large-scale reviews were published in The Lancet in 2018. One reported a "safe" drinking limit of up to seven "standard" drinks per week, equivalent to 100 grams of pure alcohol per week. The other concluded that there is no safe level of alcohol, that "the level of consumption that minimises health loss is zero" and emphasized the need to revise alcohol control policies worldwide in order to reduce overall alcohol consumption.

Alcohol-related death

Over-consumption of alcohol causes many deaths worldwide. The overall mortality from alcohol use was found to be similar to that of the effect of physical inactivity. A review in 2009 found that "the net effect of alcohol consumption on health is detrimental, with an estimated 3.8% of all global deaths and 4.6% of global disability-adjusted life-years attributable to alcohol."

Extensive research of Western cultures has consistently shown increased survival associated with light to moderate alcohol consumption. A 23-year prospective study of 12,000 male British physicians aged 48–78, found that overall mortality was significantly lower in current drinkers compared to non-drinkers even after correction for ex-drinkers. This benefit was strongest for ischemic heart disease, but was also noted for other vascular disease and respiratory disease. Death rate amongst current drinkers was higher for 'alcohol augmentable' disease such as liver disease and oral cancers, but these deaths were much less common than cardiovascular and respiratory deaths. The lowest mortality rate was found for consumption of 8 to 14 'units' per week. In the UK a unit is defined as 10ml or 8g of pure alcohol. Higher consumption increased overall mortality rate, but not above that of non-drinkers. Other studies have found age-dependent mortality risks of low-to-moderate alcohol use: an increased risk for individuals aged 16–34 (due to increased risk of cancers, accidents, liver disease, and other factors), but a decreased risk for individuals ages 55+ (due to lower incidence of ischemic heart disease).

This is consistent with other research that found a J-curve dependency between alcohol consumption and total mortality among middle aged and older men. While the mortality rates of ex-drinkers and heavy drinkers are significantly elevated, the all-cause mortality rates may be 15–18% lower among moderate drinkers. Although the definition of a drink varies between studies and countries, this meta-analysis found that low levels of alcohol intake, defined as 1–2 drinks per day for women and 2–4 drinks per day for men, was associated with lower mortality than abstainers. This claim was challenged by another study that found that in certain low quality studies occasional drinkers or ex-drinkers were included as abstainers, resulting in the increased mortality in that group. However, the J-curve for total and CHD mortality was reconfirmed by studies that took the mentioned confounders into account. There seems to be little discussion of what proportion of individuals classified as abstainers are those already at greater risk of mortality due to chronic conditions and do not or cannot consume alcohol for reasons of health or harmful interactions with medication.

The observed decrease in mortality of light-to-moderate drinkers compared to never drinkers might be partially explained by superior health and social status of the drinking group; however, the protective effect of alcohol in light to moderate drinkers remains significant even after adjusting for these confounders. Additionally, confounders such as underreporting of alcohol intake might lead to the underestimation of how much mortality is reduced in light-to-moderate drinkers.

A 2010 study confirmed the beneficial effect of moderate alcohol consumption on mortality. Subjects were grouped into abstainers, light, moderate, and heavy drinkers. The order of mortality rates from lowest to highest were moderate, light, heavy, and abstainers. The increased risk for abstainers was twice the mortality rate as for moderate drinkers. This study specifically sought to control for confounding factors including the problem of ex-drinkers considered as non-drinkers. According to another study, drinkers with heavy drinking occasions (six or more drinks at a time) have a 57% higher all-cause mortality than drinkers without heavy drinking occasions.

Mortality is lowest among young abstainers and highest among young heavy drinkers.

According to a 2018 study people who had more than seven and up to 14 standard drinks per week, were likely to have their life expectancy shortened by around 6 months. Those who consumed over 14 drinks and up to 25 per week were likely to have 1–2 years taken off their lifespan, and a consumption of over 25 standard drinks per week correlated with 4–5 fewer years.

In contrast to studies of Western cultures, research in other cultures has yielded some opposite findings. The landmark INTERHEART Study has revealed that alcohol consumption in South Asians was not protective against CAD in sharp contrast to other populations who benefit from it. In fact Asian Indians who consume alcohol had a 60% higher risk of heart attack which was greater with local spirits (80%) than branded spirits (50%). The harm was observed in alcohol users classified as occasional as well as regular light, moderate, and heavy consumers.

Another large study of 4465 subjects in India also confirmed the possible harm of alcohol consumption on coronary risk in men. Compared to lifetime abstainers, alcohol users had higher blood sugar (2 mg/dl), blood pressure (2 mm Hg) levels, and the HDL-C levels (2 mg/dl) and significantly higher tobacco use (63% vs. 21%).

Russia

One study claims that "excessive alcohol consumption in Russia, particularly by men, has in recent years caused more than half of all the deaths at ages 15–54 years." However, there are some difficulties with this study. For instance, the same study also found a protective effect of heavy drinking on breast cancer mortality. This contradicts the well established scientific view that alcohol increases breast cancer risk. On this account in further correspondence it was advised that "careful interpretation of mortality statistics in relation to alcohol use is needed, taking into account other relevant risk factors, incidence, and survival."

United Kingdom
A governmental report from Britain has found that "There were 8,724 alcohol-related deaths in 2007, lower than 2006, but more than double the 4,144 recorded in 1991. The alcohol-related death rate was 13.3 per 100,000 population in 2007, compared with 6.9 per 100,000 population in 1991." In Scotland, the NHS estimate that in 2003 one in every 20 deaths could be attributed to alcohol. A 2009 report noted that the death rate from alcohol-related disease was 9,000, a number three times that of 25 years previously.

A UK report came to the result that the effects of low-to-moderate alcohol consumption on mortality are age-dependent. Low-to-moderate alcohol use increases the risk of death for individuals aged 16–34 (due to increased risk of cancers, accidents, liver disease, and other factors), but decreases the risk of death for individuals ages 55+ (due to decreased risk of ischemic heart disease).

A study in the United Kingdom found that alcohol causes about 4% of cancer cases in the UK (12,500 cases per year).

United States
The Centers for Disease Control and Prevention (CDC) report, "From 2001–2005, there were approximately 79,000 deaths annually attributable to excessive alcohol use. In fact, excessive alcohol use is the 3rd leading lifestyle-related cause of death for people in the United States each year." A 1993 study estimated US deaths through alcohol at 100,000.

Another CDC report from 2001 estimated that medium and high consumption of alcohol led to 75,754 deaths in the United States in 2001. Low consumption of alcohol had some beneficial effects, so a net 59,180 deaths were attributed to alcohol.

Longevity
In 2016, a meta-analysis of 87 studies investigating alcohol use and mortality risk was conducted. The studies analyzed had shown the largest mortality risk reduction in moderate drinkers, but these studies did not correct for confounding variables common with certain abstainers, such as previous alcoholism, and chronic health issues. After adjusting these studies for abstainer biases, no reduction in mortality risk was found for low-volume drinkers. However, there have been individual studies that show abstainers and heavy drinkers have an increased mortality of about 50% over moderate drinkers after adjustment for confounding factors in individuals above the age of 55.

Cardiovascular system

Alcohol has been found to have anticoagulant properties. Thrombosis is lower among moderate drinkers than abstainers. A meta-analysis of randomized trials found that alcohol consumption in moderation decreases serum levels of fibrinogen, a protein that promotes clot formation, while it increases levels of tissue type plasminogen activator, an enzyme that helps dissolve clots. These changes were estimated to reduce coronary heart disease risk by about 24%. Another meta-analysis in 2011 found favorable changes in HDL cholesterol, adiponectin, and fibrinogen associated with moderate alcohol consumption. A systematic review based on 16,351 participants showed J-shaped curve for the overall relationship between cardiovascular mortality and alcohol intake. Maximal protective effect was shown with 5–10 g of alcohol consumption per day and the effect was significant up to 26 g/day alcohol consumption. Serum levels of C-reactive protein (CRP), a putative marker of inflammation and predictor of CHD (coronary heart disease) risk, are lower in moderate drinkers than in those who abstain from alcohol, suggesting that alcohol consumption in moderation might have anti-inflammatory effects. Data from one prospective study suggest that, among men with initially low alcohol consumption (</=1 drink per week), a subsequent moderate increase in alcohol consumption may lower their CVD risk.

Despite epidemiological evidence, many have cautioned against recommendations for the use of alcohol for health benefits. A physician from the World Health Organization labeled such alcohol promotion as "ridiculous and dangerous". One reviewer noted, "Despite the wealth of observational data, it is not absolutely clear that alcohol reduces cardiovascular risk, because no randomized controlled trials have been performed. Alcohol should never be recommended to patients to reduce cardiovascular risk as a substitute for the well-proven alternatives of appropriate diet, exercise, and drugs." It has been argued that the health benefits from alcohol are at best debatable and may have been exaggerated by the alcohol industry, with investigators holding that alcohol should be regarded as a recreational drug with potentially serious adverse effects on health and should not be promoted for cardio-protection.

Peripheral arterial disease
A prospective study published in 1997 found "moderate alcohol consumption appears to decrease the risk of PAD in apparently healthy men." In a large population-based study, moderate alcohol consumption was inversely associated with peripheral arterial disease in women but not in men. But when confounding by smoking was considered, the benefit extended to men. The study concluded "an inverse association between alcohol consumption and peripheral arterial disease was found in nonsmoking men and women."

Intermittent claudication
A study found that moderate consumption of alcohol had a protective effect against intermittent claudication. The lowest risk was seen in men who drank 1 to 2 drinks per day and in women who drank half to 1 drink per day.

Heart attack and stroke
Drinking in moderation has been found to help those who have had a heart attack survive it. However, excessive alcohol consumption leads to an increased risk of heart failure. A review of the literature found that half a drink of alcohol offered the best level of protection. However, they noted that at present there have been no randomised trials to confirm the evidence which suggests a protective role of low doses of alcohol against heart attacks.  There is an increased risk of hypertriglyceridemia, cardiomyopathy, hypertension, and stroke if three or more standard drinks of alcohol are taken per day. A systematic review reported that reducing alcohol intake lowers blood pressure in a dose-dependent manner in heavy drinkers. For people who drank two or fewer drinks per day, no difference was found.

Cardiomyopathy
Large amount of alcohol over the long term can lead to alcoholic cardiomyopathy. Alcoholic cardiomyopathy presents in a manner clinically identical to idiopathic dilated cardiomyopathy, involving hypertrophy of the musculature of the heart that can lead to congestive heart failure.

Hematologic diseases
Alcoholics may have anemia from several causes; they may also develop thrombocytopenia from direct toxic effect on megakaryocytes, or from hypersplenism.

Atrial fibrillation
Alcohol consumption increases the risk of atrial fibrillation, a type of abnormal heart rhythm. This remains true even at moderate levels of consumption.

Nervous system

Chronic heavy alcohol consumption impairs brain development, causes alcohol dementia, brain shrinkage, physical dependence, alcoholic polyneuropathy (also known as 'alcohol leg'), increases neuropsychiatric and cognitive disorders and causes distortion of the brain chemistry. At present, due to poor study design and methodology, the literature is inconclusive on whether moderate alcohol consumption increases the risk of dementia or decreases it. Evidence for a protective effect of low to moderate alcohol consumption on age-related cognitive decline and dementia has been suggested by some research; however, other research has not found a protective effect of low to moderate alcohol consumption. Some evidence suggests that low to moderate alcohol consumption may speed up brain volume loss. Chronic consumption of alcohol may result in increased plasma levels of the toxic amino acid homocysteine; which may explain alcohol withdrawal seizures, alcohol-induced brain atrophy and alcohol-related cognitive disturbances. Alcohol's impact on the nervous system can also include disruptions of memory and learning (see Effects of alcohol on memory), such as resulting in a blackout phenomenon.

Strokes
Epidemiological studies of middle-aged populations generally find the relationship between alcohol intake and the risk of stroke to be either U- or J-shaped. There may be very different effects of alcohol based on the type of stroke studied. The predominant form of stroke in Western cultures is ischemic, whereas non-western cultures have more hemorrhagic stroke. In contrast to the beneficial effect of alcohol on ischemic stroke, consumption of more than two drinks per day increases the risk of hemorrhagic stroke. The National Stroke Association estimates this higher amount of alcohol increases stroke risk by 50%. "For stroke, the observed relationship between alcohol consumption and risk in a given population depends on the proportion of strokes that are hemorrhagic. Light-to-moderate alcohol intake is associated with a lower risk of ischemic stroke which is likely to be, in part, causal. Hemorrhagic stroke, on the other hand, displays a log-linear relationship with alcohol intake."

Brain

Alcohol misuse is associated with widespread and significant brain lesions. Alcohol related brain damage is not only due to the direct toxic effects of alcohol; alcohol withdrawal, nutritional deficiency, electrolyte disturbances, and liver damage are also believed to contribute to alcohol-related brain damage.

Cognition and dementia
Excessive alcohol intake is associated with impaired prospective memory. This impaired cognitive ability leads to increased failure to carry out an intended task at a later date, for example, forgetting to lock the door or to post a letter on time. The higher the volume of alcohol consumed and the longer consumed, the more severe the impairments. One of the organs most sensitive to the toxic effects of chronic alcohol consumption is the brain. In the United States approximately 20% of admissions to mental health facilities are related to alcohol-related cognitive impairment, most notably alcohol-related dementia. Chronic excessive alcohol intake is also associated with serious cognitive decline and a range of neuropsychiatric complications. The elderly are the most sensitive to the toxic effects of alcohol on the brain. There is some inconclusive evidence that small amounts of alcohol taken in earlier adult life is protective in later life against cognitive decline and dementia. However, a study concluded, "Our findings suggest that, despite previous suggestions, moderate alcohol consumption does not protect older people from cognitive decline."

Wernicke–Korsakoff syndrome is a manifestation of thiamine deficiency, usually as a secondary effect of alcohol misuse. The syndrome is a combined manifestation of two eponymous disorders, Korsakoff's Psychosis and Wernicke's encephalopathy. Wernicke's encephalopathy is the acute presentation of the syndrome and is characterised by a confusional state while Korsakoff's psychosis main symptoms are amnesia and executive dysfunction. "Banana bags", intravenous fluid containers containing vitamins and minerals (bright yellow due to the vitamins), can be used to mitigate these outcomes.

Essential tremor
Essential tremors—or, in the case of essential tremors on a background of family history of essential tremors, familial tremors—can be temporarily relieved in up to two-thirds of patients by drinking small amounts of alcohol.

Ethanol is known to activate aminobutyric acid type A (GABAA) and inhibit N-methyl-D-aspartate (NMDA) glutamate receptors, which are both implicated in essential tremor pathology and could underlie the ameliorative effects. Additionally, the effects of ethanol have been studied in different animal essential tremor models. (For more details on this topic, see Essential tremor).

Sleep

Chronic use of alcohol used to induce sleep can lead to insomnia: frequent moving between sleep stages occurs, with awakenings due to headaches and diaphoresis. Stopping chronic alcohol misuse can also lead to profound disturbances of sleep with vivid dreams. Chronic alcohol misuse is associated with NREM stage 3 and 4 sleep as well as suppression of REM sleep and REM sleep fragmentation. During withdrawal REM sleep is typically exaggerated as part of a rebound effect.

Mental health effects
High rates of major depressive disorder occur in heavy drinkers. Whether it is more true that major depressive disorder causes self-medicating alcohol use, or the increased incidence of the disorder in people with an alcohol use disorder is caused by the drinking, is not known though some evidence suggests drinking causes the disorder. Alcohol misuse is associated with a number of mental health disorders and alcoholics have a very high suicide rate. A study of people hospitalized for suicide attempts found that those who were alcoholics were 75 times more likely to go on to successfully commit suicide than non-alcoholic suicide attempts. In the general alcoholic population the increased risk of suicide compared to the general public is 5-20 times greater. About 15 percent of alcoholics commit suicide, the most common methods being overdosing and cutting/scratching. There are high rates of suicide attempts, self-harm, suicidal ideation, and self-harm ideation in people with substance dependence who have been hospitalized. Use of other illicit drugs is also associated with an increased risk of suicide. About 33 percent of suicides in the under 35s are correlated with alcohol or other substance misuse.

Social skills are significantly impaired in people that have alcoholism due to the neurotoxic effects of alcohol on the brain, especially the prefrontal cortex area of the brain. The social skills that are impaired by alcohol use disorder include impairments in perceiving facial emotions, prosody perception problems and theory of mind deficits; the ability to understand humor is also impaired in people with an alcohol use disorder.

Studies have shown that alcohol dependence relates directly to cravings and irritability. Another study has shown that alcohol use is a significant predisposing factor towards antisocial behavior in children. Depression, anxiety and panic disorder are disorders commonly reported by alcohol dependent people. Alcoholism is associated with dampened activation in brain networks responsible for emotional processing (e.g. the amygdala and hippocampus). Evidence that the mental health disorders are often induced by alcohol misuse via distortion of brain neurochemistry is indicated by the improvement or disappearance of symptoms that occurs after prolonged abstinence, although problems may worsen in early withdrawal and recovery periods. Psychosis is secondary to several alcohol-related conditions including acute intoxication and withdrawal after significant exposure. Chronic alcohol misuse can cause psychotic type symptoms to develop, more so than with other illicit substances. Alcohol misuse has been shown to cause an 800% increased risk of psychotic disorders in men and a 300% increased risk of psychotic disorders in women which are not related to pre-existing psychiatric disorders. This is significantly higher than the increased risk of psychotic disorders seen from cannabis use making alcohol misuse a very significant cause of psychotic disorders. Approximately 3 percent of people who are alcohol dependent experience psychosis during acute intoxication or withdrawal. Alcohol-related psychosis may manifest itself through a kindling mechanism. The mechanism of alcohol-related psychosis is due to distortions to neuronal membranes, gene expression, as well as thiamin deficiency. It is possible in some cases that excessive alcohol use, via a kindling mechanism, can cause the development of a chronic substance-induced psychotic disorder, i.e. schizophrenia. The effects of an alcohol-related psychosis include an increased risk of depression and suicide as well as psychosocial impairments. However, moderate wine drinking has been shown to lower the risk for depression.

While alcohol initially helps social phobia or panic symptoms, with longer term alcohol misuse can often worsen social phobia symptoms and can cause panic disorder to develop or worsen, during alcohol intoxication and especially during the alcohol withdrawal syndrome. This effect is not unique to alcohol but can also occur with long-term use of drugs which have a similar mechanism of action to alcohol such as the benzodiazepines, which are sometimes prescribed as tranquilizers to people with alcohol problems. Approximately half of patients attending mental health services for conditions including anxiety disorders such as panic disorder or social phobia have alcohol or benzodiazepine dependence. It was noted that every individual has an individual sensitivity level to alcohol or sedative hypnotic drugs and what one person can tolerate without ill health another will have very ill health and that even moderate drinking can cause rebound anxiety syndromes and sleep disorders. A person who is experiencing the toxic effects of alcohol will not benefit from other therapies or medications as they do not address the root cause of the symptoms.

Addiction to alcohol, as with any addictive substance tested so far, has been correlated with an enduring reduction in the expression of GLT1 (EAAT2) in the nucleus accumbens and is implicated in the drug-seeking behavior expressed nearly universally across all documented addiction syndromes. This long-term dysregulation of glutamate transmission is associated with an increase in vulnerability to both relapse-events after re-exposure to drug-use triggers as well as an overall increase in the likelihood of developing addiction to other reinforcing drugs. Drugs which help to re-stabilize the glutamate system such as N-acetylcysteine have been proposed for the treatment of addiction to cocaine, nicotine, and alcohol.

The effect on depression and returning to drinking among individuals with alcohol dependence has always been controversial. Studies show that after doing a study on men and women hospitalized for alcohol dependence the likelihood of returning to drinking with depression is extremely high. A diagnosis of major depression at entry into an inpatient treatment for alcohol dependence showed shorter times to first drink and also relapse in both women and men.

Digestive system and weight gain

The impact of alcohol on weight-gain is contentious: some studies find no effect, others find decreased or increased effect on weight gain.

Alcohol use increases the risk of chronic gastritis (stomach inflammation); it is one cause of cirrhosis, hepatitis, and pancreatitis in both its chronic and acute forms.

Metabolic syndrome
A national survey (NHANES) conducted in the U.S. concluded, "Mild to moderate alcohol consumption is associated with a lower prevalence of the metabolic syndrome, with a favorable influence on lipids, waist circumference, and fasting insulin. This association was strongest among whites and among beer and wine drinkers." Similarly, a national survey conducted in Korea reported a J-curve association between alcohol intake and metabolic syndrome: "The results of the present study suggest that the metabolic syndrome is negatively associated with light alcohol consumption (1–15 g alcohol/d) in Korean adults," but risk increased at higher alcohol consumption.

Gallbladder effects
Research has found that drinking reduces the risk of developing gallstones. Compared with alcohol abstainers, the relative risk of gallstone disease, controlling for age, sex, education, smoking, and body mass index, is 0.83 for occasional and regular moderate drinkers (< 25 ml of ethanol per day), 0.67 for intermediate drinkers (25-50 ml per day), and 0.58 for heavy drinkers. This inverse association was consistent across strata of age, sex, and body mass index." Frequency of drinking also appears to be a factor. "An increase in frequency of alcohol consumption also was related to decreased risk. Combining the reports of quantity and frequency of alcohol intake, a consumption pattern that reflected frequent intake (5–7 days/week) of any given amount of alcohol was associated with a decreased risk, as compared with nondrinkers. In contrast, infrequent alcohol intake (1–2 days/week) showed no significant association with risk."

A large self-reported study published in 1998 found no correlation between gallbladder disease and multiple factors including smoking, alcohol consumption, hypertension, and coffee consumption. A retrospective study from 1997 found vitamin C (ascorbic acid) supplement use in drinkers was associated with a lower prevalence of gallbladder disease, but this association was not seen in non-drinkers.

Liver disease
Alcoholic liver disease is a major public health problem. For example, in the United States up to two million people have alcohol-related liver disorders. Chronic heavy alcohol consumption can cause fatty liver, cirrhosis, and alcoholic hepatitis. Treatment options are limited and consist of most importantly discontinuing alcohol consumption. In cases of severe liver disease, the only treatment option may be a liver transplant from alcohol abstinent donors. Research is being conducted into the effectiveness of anti-TNFs. Certain complementary medications, e.g., milk thistle and silymarin, appear to offer some benefit. Alcohol is a leading cause of liver cancer in the Western world, accounting for 32-45% of hepatic cancers. Up to half a million people in the United States develop alcohol-related liver cancer.

Pancreatitis
Alcohol misuse is a leading cause of both acute pancreatitis and chronic pancreatitis. Alcoholic pancreatitis can result in severe abdominal pain and may progress to pancreatic cancer.
Chronic pancreatitis often results in intestinal malabsorption, and can result in diabetes.

Body composition
Alcohol affects the nutritional state of the chronic drinkers. It can decrease food consumption and lead to malabsorption.  It can create imbalance in the skeletal muscle mass and cause muscle wasting. Chronic consumption alcohol can also increase breakdown of important proteins in our body which can affect gene expression.

Oral and dental implications

Fetal alcohol syndrome 
The frequency, time, and amount of alcohol consumption during pregnancy can cause various dental anomalies in children with Fetal Alcohol Syndrome (FAS). Not only does it increase the chance of children developing cleft lip and palate, newborns will tend to show agenesis, maxillary overjet, crowded incisors, anterior open bite and diastemas. These dental and maxillofacial changes are thought to be caused by the teratogenic effects of alcohol on the fetus in which FAS causes an alteration in the MSX1 and MSX2 genes. Both genes play an important part in the maxillary process's fusion and odontogenic formation.

Oral cancer 
The consumption of alcohol alone is not associated with an increased risk of oral squamous cell carcinoma (OSCC); however, the synergistic consumption of alcohol and tobacco is positively associated with the occurrence of (OSCC), and significantly increases an individual's risk. Studies confirm that alcohol dissolves the lipid component of epithelium and increases the permeability, amplifying the toxicity of carcinogenic components of tobacco. Limiting the overall consumption of the two has shown to reduce the risk of OSCC by three-fourth. The knowledge provided is useful for better understanding the differences in the effect of the combined consumption of alcohol and tobacco, in the development of OSCC.

Alcohol consumption has frequently been associated with an increased risk of oral cancer in current literature. Studies have found that people that consume alcohol were two times more likely to develop oral cancer in comparison to people who did not. The mechanisms in which alcohol acts as a carcinogen within the oral cavity are currently not fully understood. It is thought to be a multifactorial disease which then gives rise to a cancerous lesion. Many theories have become apparent in research, including alcohol being responsible for high estrogen and androgen levels, specifically in women, which may facilitate the alcohol-related immunodeficiency and/or immunosuppression that causes carcinogenesis. Therefore, immediate cessation of the habit of alcohol consumption can aid in decreasing the risk of oral cancer.

Alcohol-based mouthwashes used to be very common and can still be purchased for use today. Correlation in the presence of alcohol in mouthwashes with development of oral and pharyngeal cancer is unknown due to lack of evidence. However, it has been suggested that acetaldehyde, the first metabolite of ethanol, plays a role in the carcinogenesis of alcohol in oral cancer. Acetaldehyde, has been found to increase when in the salivary medium after an alcoholic beverage has been consumed and could possibly occur with alcohol-based mouthwashes as well, posing as a possible risk factor for oral cancer. However, more research must be conducted regarding these theories.

Periodontitis 
Alcohol Consumption is associated with a higher risk of Periodontitis, an inflammatory disease of the gums around the teeth. There was also found to be a dose-response relationship in which the risk of periodontitis increased by 0.4% for each 1g/day in alcohol consumption. Mechanisms explaining the relationship between the two are still unclear however, several explanations have been suggested. One explanation is the weakening of neutrophil activity by alcohol consumption which potentially leads to bacterial overgrowth and increased bacterial penetration subsequently leading to periodontal inflammation and periodontal disease. Characteristics of the disease include shrinkage of gingival height and increased mobility of teeth which may exfoliate if the disease continues to progress. A patient's consumption of alcohol needs to be monitored to estimate the risk of periodontitis, but further well-designed cohort studies are needed to reaffirm theses results.

Cleft lip and palate 
Various maternal behavioral factors have been known to increase the risk of oral clefts such as folate deficiency, antiepileptic drugs, smoking, and alcohol consumption. Even though alcohol is known to be a folic acid antagonist, there is no significant correlation between mild to moderate consumption of alcohol during pregnancy and the risk of oral clefts. However, as a baby's palate and lip develop during the first trimester of the pregnancy (first 12 weeks), mothers should be aware to avoid drinking during this time. Research on the correlation between heavy drinking and orofacial cleft is still necessary for confirmation.

Other systems

Respiratory system
Chronic alcohol ingestion can impair multiple critical cellular functions in the lungs. These cellular impairments can lead to increased susceptibility to serious complications from lung disease. Recent research cites alcoholic lung disease as comparable to liver disease in alcohol-related mortality. Alcoholics have a higher risk of developing acute respiratory distress syndrome (ARDS) and experience higher rates of mortality from ARDS when compared to non-alcoholics. In contrast to these findings, a large prospective study has shown a protective effect of moderate alcohol consumption on respiratory mortality.

Kidney stones
Research indicates that drinking beer or wine is associated with a lower risk of developing kidney stones.

Sexual function

Low to moderate alcohol consumption is shown to have protective effect for men's erectile function. Several reviews and meta-analyses of existing literature show that low to moderate alcohol consumption significantly decrease erectile dysfunction risk.

Men's sexual behaviors can be affected dramatically by high alcohol consumption. Both chronic and acute alcohol consumption have been shown in most studies
 (but not all) to inhibit testosterone production in the testes.  This is believed to be caused by the metabolism of alcohol reducing the NAD+/NADH ratio both in the liver and the testes; since the synthesis of testosterone requires NAD+, this tends to reduce testosterone production.

Long term excessive intake of alcohol can lead to damage to the central nervous system and the peripheral nervous system resulting in loss of sexual desire and impotence in men. This is caused by reduction of testosterone from ethanol-induced testicular atrophy, resulting in increased feminisation of males and is a clinical feature of alcohol abusing males who have cirrhosis of the liver.

Hormonal imbalance
Excessive alcohol intake can result in hyperoestrogenisation. It has been speculated that alcoholic beverages may contain estrogen-like compounds. In men, high levels of estrogen can lead to testicular failure and the development of feminine traits including development of male breasts, called gynecomastia. In women, increased levels of estrogen due to excessive alcohol intake have been related to an increased risk of breast cancer.

Diabetes mellitus
A meta-analysis determined the dose-response relationships by sex and end point using lifetime abstainers as the reference group. A U-shaped relationship was found for both sexes. Compared with lifetime abstainers, the relative risk (RR) for type 2 diabetes among men was most protective when consuming 22 g/day alcohol and became deleterious at just over 60 g/day alcohol. Among women, consumption of 24 g/day alcohol was most protective, and became deleterious at about 50 g/day alcohol. A systematic review on intervention studies in women also supported this finding. It reported that alcohol consumption in moderation improved insulin sensitivity among women.

The way in which alcohol is consumed (i.e., with meals or binge drinking) affects various health outcomes. It may be the case that the risk of diabetes associated with heavy alcohol consumption is due to consumption mainly on the weekend as opposed to the same amount spread over a week. In the United Kingdom "advice on weekly consumption is avoided". A twenty-year twin study from Finland reported that moderate alcohol consumption may reduce the risk of type 2 diabetes in men and women. However, binge drinking and high alcohol consumption was found to increase the risk of type 2 diabetes in women.

Rheumatoid arthritis
Regular consumption of alcohol is associated with an increased risk of gouty arthritis and a decreased risk of rheumatoid arthritis. Two recent studies report that the more alcohol consumed, the lower the risk of developing rheumatoid arthritis. Among those who drank regularly, the one-quarter who drank the most were up to 50% less likely to develop the disease compared to the half who drank the least.

The researchers noted that moderate alcohol consumption also reduces the risk of other inflammatory processes such as cardiovascular disease. Some of the biological mechanisms by which ethanol reduces the risk of destructive arthritis and prevents the loss of bone mineral density (BMD), which is part of the disease process.

A study concluded, "Alcohol either protects from RA or, subjects with RA curtail their drinking after the manifestation of RA". Another study found, "Postmenopausal women who averaged more than 14 alcoholic drinks per week had a reduced risk of rheumatoid arthritis..."

Osteoporosis
Moderate alcohol consumption is associated with higher bone mineral density in postmenopausal women. "...Alcohol consumption significantly decreased the likelihood [of osteoporosis]." "Moderate alcohol intake was associated with higher BMD in postmenopausal elderly women." "Social drinking is associated with higher bone mineral density in men and women [over 45]." However, heavy alcohol use is associated with bone loss.

Skin
Chronic excessive alcohol use is associated with a wide range of skin disorders including urticaria, porphyria cutanea tarda, flushing, cutaneous stigmata of cirrhosis, psoriasis, pruritus, seborrheic dermatitis, and rosacea.

A 2010 study concluded, "Nonlight beer intake is associated with an increased risk of developing psoriasis among women. Other alcoholic beverages did not increase the risk of psoriasis in this study."

Immune system

Bacterial infection
Excessive alcohol consumption seen in people with an alcohol use disorder is a known risk factor for developing pneumonia.

Common cold
A study on the common cold found that "Greater numbers of alcoholic drinks (up to three or four per day) were associated with decreased risk for developing colds because drinking was associated with decreased illness following infection. However, the benefits of drinking occurred only among nonsmokers. ... Although alcohol consumption did not influence risk of clinical illness for smokers, moderate alcohol consumption was associated with decreased risk for nonsmokers."

Another study concluded, "Findings suggest that wine intake, especially red wine, may have a protective effect against common cold. Beer, spirits, and total alcohol intakes do not seem to affect the incidence of common cold."

Cancer

In 1988, the International Agency for Research on Cancer (Centre International de Recherche sur le Cancer) of the World Health Organization classified alcohol as a Group 1 carcinogen, stating "There is sufficient evidence for the carcinogenicity of alcoholic beverages in humans.... Alcoholic beverages are carcinogenic to humans (Group 1)." The U.S. Department of Health & Human Services' National Toxicology Program in 2000 listed alcohol as a known carcinogen.

It was estimated in 2006 that "3.6% of all cancer cases worldwide are related to alcohol drinking, resulting in 3.5% of all cancer deaths." A European study from 2011 found that one in 10 of all cancers in men and one in 33 in women were caused by past or current alcohol intake. The World Cancer Research Fund panel report Food, Nutrition, Physical Activity and the Prevention of Cancer: a Global Perspective finds the evidence "convincing" that alcoholic drinks increase the risk of the following cancers: mouth, pharynx and larynx, oesophagus, colorectum (men), breast (pre- and postmenopause).

Even light and moderate alcohol consumption increases cancer risk in individuals, especially with respect to squamous cell carcinoma of the esophagus, oropharyngeal cancer, and breast cancer.

Acetaldehyde, a metabolic product of alcohol, is suspected to promote cancer. Typically the liver eliminates 99% of acetaldehyde produced. However, liver disease and certain genetic enzyme deficiencies result in high acetaldehyde levels. Heavy drinkers who are exposed to high acetaldehyde levels due to a genetic defect in alcohol dehydrogenase have been found to be at greater risk of developing cancers of the upper gastrointestinal tract and liver. A review in 2007 found "convincing evidence that acetaldehyde... is responsible for the carcinogenic effect of ethanol... owing to its multiple mutagenic effects on DNA." Acetaldehyde can react with DNA to create DNA adducts including the Cr-Pdg adduct. This Cr-PdG adduct "is likely to play a central role in the mechanism of alcoholic beverage related carcinogenesis."

Alcohol's effect on the fetus

Fetal alcohol syndrome or FAS is a birth defect that occurs in the offspring of women who drink alcohol during pregnancy. More risks than benefits according to a survey of current knowledge. Alcohol crosses the placental barrier and can stunt fetal growth or weight, create distinctive facial stigmata, damaged neurons and brain structures, and cause other physical, mental, or behavioural problems. Fetal alcohol exposure is the leading known cause of intellectual disability in the Western world. Alcohol consumption during pregnancy is associated with brain insulin and insulin-like growth factor resistance.

Short term-term effects of alcoholism on family and children 
Children raised in alcoholic families have the potential to suffer emotional distress as they move into their own committed relationships. These children are at a higher risk for divorce and separation, unstable marital conditions and fractured families. Feelings of depression and antisocial behaviors experienced in early childhood frequently contribute to marital conflict and domestic violence. Women are more likely than men to be victims of alcohol-related domestic violence.

Children of alcoholics often incorporate behaviors learned as children into their marital relationships. These behaviors lead to poor parenting practices. For example, adult children of alcoholics may simultaneously express love and rejection toward a child or spouse. This is known as insecure attachment. Insecure attachment contributes to trust and bonding issues with intimate partners and offspring. In addition, prior parental emotional unavailability contributes to poor conflict resolution skills in adult relationships. Evidence shows a correlation between alcoholic fathers who display harsh and ineffective parenting practices with adolescent and adult alcohol dependence.

Children of alcoholics are often unable to trust other adults due to fear of abandonment. Further, because children learn their bonding behaviors from watching their parents' interactions, daughters of alcoholic fathers may be unable to interact appropriately with men when they reach adulthood. Poor behavior modeling by alcoholic parents contributes to inadequate understanding of how to engage in opposite gender interactions.

Sons of alcoholics are at risk for poor self-regulation that is often displayed in the preschool years. This leads to blaming others for behavioral problems and difficulties with impulse control. Poor decision-making correlates to early alcohol use, especially in sons of alcoholics. Sons often demonstrate thrill-seeking behavior, harm avoidance, and exhibit a low level of frustration tolerance.

Economic impact from long-term consumption of alcohol 
There is currently no consistent approach to measuring the economic impact of alcohol consumption. The economic burden such as direct, indirect, and intangible cost of diseases can be estimated through cost-of-illness studies. Direct costs are estimated through prevalence and incidence studies, while indirect costs are estimated through the human capital method, the demographic method, and the friction cost method. However it is difficult to accurately measure the economic impact due to differences in methodologies, cost items related to alcohol consumption, and measurement techniques.

Alcohol dependence has a far reaching impact on health outcomes. A study conducted in Germany in 2016 found the economic burden for those dependent on alcohol was 50% higher than those who were not. In the study, over half of the economic cost was due to lost productivity, and only 6% was due to alcohol treatment programs. The economic cost was mostly borne by individuals between 30 and 49 years old. In another study conducted with data from eight European countries, 77% of alcohol dependent patients had psychiatric and somatic co-morbidity, which in turn increased systematic healthcare and economic cost. Alcohol consumption can also affect the immune system and produce complications in people with HIV, pneumonia, and tuberculosis.

Indirect costs due to alcohol dependence are significant. The biggest indirect cost comes from lost productivity, followed by premature mortality. Men with alcohol dependence in the U.S. have lower labor force participation by 2.5%, lower earnings by 5.0%, and higher absenteeism by 0.5–1.2 days. Female binge drinkers have higher absenteeism by 0.4–0.9 days. Premature mortality is another large contributor to indirect costs of alcohol dependence. In 2004, 3.8% of global deaths were attributable to alcohol (6.3% for men and 1.1% for women). Those under 60 years old have much higher prevalence in global deaths attributable to alcohol at 5.3%.

In general, indirect costs such as premature mortality due to alcohol dependence, loss of productivity due to absenteeism and presenteeism, and cost of property damage and enforcement, far exceed the direct health care and law enforcement costs. Aggregating the economic cost from all sources, the impact can range from 0.45 to 5.44% of a country's gross domestic product (GDP). The wide range is due to inconsistency in measurement of economic burden, as researchers in some studies attributed possible positive effects from long term alcohol consumption.

See also
 Short-term effects of alcohol consumption
 Alcohol and suicide
 Self-medication on CNS depressants (alcohol)
 Self-medicated effectiveness on alcohol

References

External links

 Alcohol, Other Drugs, and Health: Current Evidence. Boston University/National Institute on Alcohol Abuse and Alcoholism Journal
 Alcohol is linked to high blood pressure, cancers and heart attack (NHS)

 Long
Alc